Onychoteuthis compacta is a species of squid in the family Onychoteuthidae, known to occur in Hawaiian waters. as well as in other areas of the Central Pacific and western north-central Atlantic, it probably has a circumglobar distribution. The species is known to have a mantle length of at least 122 mm for females and 127 mm for males. Each tentacle has 22 club hooks, measuring approximately 30 mm in mature specimens.

References

External links
 Tree of Life web project: Onychoteuthis compacta

Squid
Molluscs described in 1913
Taxa named by Samuel Stillman Berry